Telésforo Pedraza Ortega (born 24 July 1945 in Tunja) is a Colombian politician, diplomat and lawyer.

Life 
Born in Tunja, Boyacá, Pedraza studied law at the Free University of Colombia. A Colombian Conservative Party member, Pedraza served as Councilor of Bogotá, Member of the Chamber of Representatives for the same city on five occasions (2002-2004; 2005-2006; 2009-2010; 2010-2014; 2014-2018), Senator and Secretary of Education of Bogotá. He lost the leadership of the Conservative Party list in Bogotá in the 2018 legislative elections, and lost the re-election.

Also, was Ambassador to Netherlands and consul in Romania and Sweden.

References 

People from Tunja
20th-century Colombian lawyers
Ambassadors of Colombia to the Netherlands
Members of the Senate of Colombia
Members of the Chamber of Representatives of Colombia
Colombian Conservative Party politicians
Free University of Colombia alumni

1945 births
Living people